Dominic Andrew Coleman (born 29 January 1970 in Solihull, Warwickshire) is a British actor. He went to secondary school at Tudor Grange Academy Solihull which then led him to train at Leeds University's Bretton Hall where he studied a BA (hons) in Dramatic Arts.  He lives in London with his wife and children.

Acting history
Born in the Shirley district of Solihull, he has appeared in Stupid!, Sex Lives of the Potato Men and in The Cup as Vincent Farrell. In 2003 he presented the 2003 series The People's Book of Records. He also appeared in an episode of My Hero as the shady journalist Kevin Trent in the episode "Shock, horror!" He also provides the voice of Arthur Weasley in various Harry Potter video games.

He appeared on TV as a recurring customer in the BBC comedy series, Miranda and reprised his role for episodes in 2013 and 2015. He also starred as Nan's husband Jake in Nan's Christmas Carol, and was introduced as the character 'Gaz' in ITV's Coronation Street. In 2012 Coleman played Neville in the Sky1 sitcom Trollied. 2013 saw Coleman playing the role of Jamie in Heading Out. 

In 2014, Labour supporter Coleman starred as David Cameron in the Labour Party (UK) Party Political Broadcast, The Un-Credible Shrinking Man. He appeared as a mechanoid called Butler in a series 11 episode of the TV comedy series Red Dwarf first aired in 2016.

Coleman features in the BBC Radio 4 comedy sketch series 'Recorded for training Purposes', and was also in the music video for Groove Armada's If Everybody Looked The Same. He starred in episode 6 of Hank Zipzer playing Mick McKelty. He appeared in the BBC one-off remake of Porridge as Mr Braithwaite the placid prison officer.

Filmography

Film

Television

Video games

References

External links

1970 births
English male film actors
English male television actors
English male video game actors
English male voice actors
Living people
Male actors from Warwickshire
People from Solihull
Labour Party (UK) people
20th-century English male actors
21st-century English male actors